Dicanticinta is a genus of moths belonging to the family Tortricidae.

Species
Dicanticinta diticinctana (Walsingham, 1900)

See also
List of Tortricidae genera

References

External links
tortricidae.com

Archipini
Tortricidae genera